Journey to Jerusalem is a 2003 Bulgarian drama film directed by Ivan Nitchev. It was selected as the Bulgarian entry for the Best Foreign Language Film at the 76th Academy Awards, but it was not nominated.

Cast
 Elena Petrova
 Aleksandr Morfov
 Vasil Vasilev-Zueka
 Tatyana Lolova
 Georgi Rusev
 Reni Vrangova
 Hristo Garbov

See also
 List of submissions to the 76th Academy Awards for Best Foreign Language Film
 List of Bulgarian submissions for the Academy Award for Best International Feature Film

References

External links
 

2003 films
2003 drama films
Bulgarian drama films
2000s Bulgarian-language films